The northern collared lemming or Nearctic collared lemming (Dicrostonyx groenlandicus), sometimes called the Peary Land collared lemming in Canada, is a small lemming found in Arctic North America and Wrangel Island. At one time, it was considered to be a subspecies of the Arctic lemming (Dicrostonyx torquatus). Some sources believe several other species of collared lemmings found in North America are actually subspecies of D. groenlandicus.

Description
It has a short chunky body covered with thick grey fur with a thin black stripe along its back and light grey underparts. It has small ears, short legs and a very short tail. It has a pale brown collar across its chest. In winter, its fur turns white, and it has large digging claws on its front feet. It is 14 cm long with a 1.5 cm tail and weighs about 40 g.

Distribution and habitat
It is found in the tundra of northern Canada, Alaska and Greenland. A disjunct population is also present on Wrangel Island in Siberia; this population was formerly considered its own species, the Wrangel lemming (D. vinogradovi).

Diet
It feeds on grasses, sedges and other green vegetation in summer, and twigs of willow, aspen and birches in winter.

Predators
Predators include snowy owls, gulls, wolverines, the Arctic fox and the polar bear.

Breeding
Female lemmings have two or three litters of four to eight young in a year. The young are born in a nest in a burrow or concealed in vegetation.

Behaviour
It is active year-round, day and night. It makes runways through the surface vegetation and also digs burrows above the permafrost. It burrows under the snow in winter. Lemming populations go through a three- or four-year cycle of boom and bust. When their population peaks, lemmings disperse from overcrowded areas.

References

Dicrostonyx
Mammals described in 1823
Mammals of the Arctic
Mammals of Greenland
Mammals of Canada
Mammals of the United States
Arctic land animals

Mammals of Siberia